The Jensen S-type is a car built by Jensen Motors from 1936 until 1941 as both a saloon and a convertible. It was the firm's first volume production car, based on Ford V8 engines from the United States, and chassis parts from Ford of Britain sourced through M B K Motors. The car was built on a steel chassis and used aluminium for the body panels. The cars were available in three body styles: 2-door convertible, 3-door tourer, and 4-door saloon.

In total, there were about 50 S-type cars built by Jensen in their West Bromwich factory, with an estimated 10 cars still surviving today.

References

S-type

Cars introduced in 1936
1940s cars